The Royal National Lifeboat Institution (RNLI) is the largest charity that saves lives at sea around the coasts of the United Kingdom, the Republic of Ireland, the Channel Islands, and the Isle of Man, as well as on some inland waterways. It is one of several lifeboat services operating in the same area.

Founded in 1824 as the National Institution for the Preservation of Life from Shipwreck, soon afterwards becoming the Royal National Institution for the Preservation of Life from Shipwreck, under the patronage of King George IV.  On 5 October 1854, the institution’s name was changed to its current name (RNLI), and in 1860 was granted a royal charter.

The RNLI is a charity in the UK and in the Republic of Ireland and has enjoyed royal patronage since its foundation, the most recent being Queen Elizabeth II until her death on 8 September 2022. The RNLI is principally funded by legacies (65%) and donations (28%), with the remainder from merchandising and investment. Most of the members of its lifeboat crews are unpaid volunteers.

The RNLI is based in Poole, Dorset. It has 238 lifeboat stations and operates 444 lifeboats. RNLI lifeguards operate on more than 200 beaches: the lifeguards are paid by local authorities, but the RNLI provides equipment and training. The institution also operates flood rescue teams nationally and internationally, the latter prepared to travel to emergencies overseas at short notice.

Considerable effort is put into training and education by the institution, particularly for young people; in 2013, more than 6,000 children a week were spoken to by education volunteers about sea and beach safety, and over 800 children a week received training. Crews rescued on average 22 people a day in 2015. The institution has saved some 140,000 lives since its foundation, at a cost of more than 600 lives lost in service.

History

Sir William Hillary moved to the Isle of Man in 1808. Being aware of the treacherous nature of the Irish Sea, with many ships being wrecked around the Manx coast, he drew up plans for a national lifeboat service manned by trained crews. Initially he received little response from the Admiralty. However, on appealing to the more philanthropic members of London society, the plans were adopted and, with the help of Member of Parliament Thomas Wilson and former MP and merchant George Hibbert, the Institution for the Preservation of Life from Shipwreck was founded at a very well-attended public meeting at the London Tavern on 4 March 1824, presided over by the Archbishop of Canterbury, Charles Manners-Sutton. The Institution gained the patronage of King George IV, and not long afterwards the granting of the Royal prefix, making it Royal National Institution for the Preservation of Life from Shipwreck. The first president of the Institution was the then Prime Minister, Lord Liverpool.

In 1826, George Palmer joined the society, and was deputy chairman of the society for over 25 years. He created a new design for a lifeboat which was officially adopted by the Institution in 1828 and retained until superseded by the system of self-righting lifeboats in 1858. Palmer's role was crucial in getting Algernon Percy, 4th Duke of Northumberland appointed as president of the Institution, an office he held from 1851 to 1865.

At the age of 60, Sir William took part in the 1830 rescue of the packet St George, which had foundered on Conister Rock at the entrance to Douglas Harbour. He commanded the lifeboat and was washed overboard with others of the lifeboat crew, yet finally everyone aboard the St George was rescued with no loss of life. It was this incident which prompted Sir William to set up a scheme to build The Tower of Refuge on Conister Rock – a project completed in 1832 which stands to this day at the entrance to Douglas Harbour. In 1849 Prince Albert added his support to the Institution) and the first of the new lifeboats to be built was stationed at Douglas in recognition of the work of Sir William.

The Institution underwent a reorganisation under the presidency of the Duke of Northumberland, leading to a description of him as "second founder", and on 5 October 1854, its name was changed to the Royal National Lifeboat Institution, abbreviated as RNLI.

Algernon Percy, 6th Duke of Northumberland was President from 1866(7?) to 1899, and Henry Percy, 7th Duke of Northumberland presided from 1911 until his death in 1918. It was he who founded the Duke of Northumberland's Life-boat Essay Competition in Elementary Schools. Alan Percy, 8th Duke of Northumberland, a British Army officer, first became a member upon the death of his father in 1918, then was elected Vice-President in 1921, and was also president and patron of a couple of branches. He died on 23 August 1930.

The RNLI was a founder member of the International Lifeboat Federation, now known as the International Maritime Rescue Federation (IMRF).

Design of the flag
The first design of the RNLI flag was created by Leonora Preston in 1884 after her brother was rescued by Ramsgate lifeboat volunteers. The design depicts Saint George's Cross bordered by a dark blue line and within the white cantons, initials of the charity name coloured red, the first design included the Tudor crown worn by King George VI at the centre of the cross with a foul anchor below it, representing the charity's dedication to the royal charter and to the sea. The design was formally adopted in 1908 and was flown at every lifeboat station thereafter. In 1953, following Queen Elizabeth II's coronation, the design was altered to exchange the Tudor crown with St. Edward's crown to represent the newly appointed monarch.

Financial difficulties
In its first year of existence the RNLI had raised £10,000; however by 1849, income had dropped to £354. In 1850, 28-year-old Welshman Richard Lewis became secretary, with the 4th Duke of Northumberland's presidency commencing in the following year, and along with a new management committee and a new Inspector of Lifeboats, Captain John Ross Ward (later Vice Admiral) of the Royal Navy, big changes were made. Captain Ward was responsible for the design and introduction of  new cork lifejackets for lifeboat volunteers, while Lewis was largely responsible for turning the financial fortunes around.

The RNLI accepted a government subsidy of £2,000, which rose in subsequent years. This lasted until 1869, when the RNLI ceased accepting subsidies – it had found that voluntary donations had fallen by more than the subsidies; in addition, the government's imposition of bureaucracy and regulations were detrimental to the service. By 1883, the annual income was over £40,000. The loss of 27 lifeboat crew of Southport and St Annes in 1886 gave new impetus to fundraising and an 1889 appeal raised £10,000. The first Lifeboat Saturday was held in that year.

Growth in services under Lewis
When Lewis became secretary in 1850, the institution had care of 96 lifeboats, but only about 12 were actually usable. By the time Lewis died 30 years later, it had 274 lifeboats, ready for use by trained crews at short notice. In 1850, 470 lives were saved; in 1883, 955 were rescued.

Wartime
During the First World War, lifeboat crews launched 1,808 times, rescuing 5,332 people. With many younger men on active service, the average age of a lifeboatman was over 50. Many launches were to ships that had been torpedoed or struck mines, including naval or merchant vessels on war duty; a notable example was the hospital ship  which foundered in 1914 and was attended by six lifeboats, saving 144 lives over a 50-hour rescue mission.

The Second World War placed considerable extra demands on the RNLI, particularly in south and east England where the threat of invasion and enemy activity was ever-present, rescuing downed aircrew a frequent occurrence, and the constant danger of mines. During the war, 6,376 lives were saved.

Dunkirk evacuation

Nineteen RNLI lifeboats sailed to Dunkirk between 27 May and 4 June 1940 to assist with the Dunkirk evacuation. Both Coxswains, Edward Parker from Margate and Howard Primrose Knight from Ramsgate, were awarded the Distinguished Service Medal for their "gallantry and determination when ferrying troops from the beaches". Of the other lifeboats and crews summoned to Dover by the Admiralty, the first arrivals questioned – reasonably in their view – the details of the service, in particular the impracticality of running heavy lifeboats on to the beach, loading them with soldiers, then floating them off. The dispute resulted in the first three crews being sent home. Subsequent lifeboats arriving were commandeered without discussion, much to the disappointment of many lifeboatmen. A later RNLI investigation resulted in the dismissal of two Hythe crew members, who were nevertheless vindicated in one aspect of their criticism, as Hythe's Viscountess Wakefield was run on to the beach at La Panne and unable to be refloated; she was the only lifeboat to be lost in the operation. Some RNLI crew members stayed in Dover for the emergency to provide repair and refuelling facilities, and after the end of the evacuation most lifeboats returned to their stations with varying levels of damage and continued their lifesaving services.

1953 Coronation Fleet Review
Four lifeboats took part in the 1953 Coronation Fleet Review; they were from Flamborough,  and Campbeltown.

21st century

Migrant crisis 

In 2021, the RNLI received press attention for its rescue of migrants attempting to cross the English Channel via boat. Its actions received a polarising response, with the British government praising its "vital work" while politician Nigel Farage criticised the organisation as being a "taxi service" for human traffickers. After its chief executive Mark Dowie disclosed verbal abuse received by RNLI volunteers from members of the public due to its rescuing of migrants, the charity saw a 3000% rise in daily donations and a 270% increase in people viewing its website's volunteering opportunities page.

Rescues, losses and honours

Rescues and lives saved
The RNLI's lifeboat crews and lifeguards have saved more than 140,000 lives since 1824. The RNLI makes a distinction between people aided and lives saved. There were 8,462 lifeboat launches in 2014, rescuing 8,727 people, including saving 460 lives. Lifeguards helped or rescued 19,353 people. Flood rescuers deployed seven times. In 2015 crews rescued on average 22 people a day.

The biggest rescue in the RNLI's history was on 17 March 1907, when the 12,000 tonne liner SS Suevic hit the Maenheere Reef near Lizard Point in Cornwall. In a strong gale and dense fog, RNLI lifeboat volunteers rescued 456 passengers, including 70 babies. Six silver RNLI medals were later awarded, two to Suevic crew members.

Losses

More than 600 people have lost their lives in the RNLI's service; their names are inscribed on the RNLI Memorial sculpture at RNLI HQ, Poole.

Honours

More than 2,500 medals have been awarded by the RNLI to its crews for bravery, with 150 gold, 1,563 silver and 791 bronze medals earned up to 2004. The Thanks of the Institution Inscribed on Vellum or a framed Letter of Appreciation may be given for other notable acts, such as those awarded to crews of Aberystwyth Lifeboat Station. The Ralph Glister Award is a monetary award made for the most meritorious service in each year and was inaugurated in 1968. The Walter and Elizabeth Groombridge Award is given annually for the most outstanding service by an Atlantic 21 (and successors) lifeboat crew. Established in 1986 as the Walter Groombridge Award in memory of Brighton Lifeboat Station's Administration Officer it was renamed in memory of his wife who died in 1989.

He also received the George Cross and the British Empire Medal and is known as "The Greatest of all Lifeboatmen". The youngest recipient was Frederick Carter (11) who with Frank Perry (16) was awarded a Silver Medal for a rescue at Weymouth in 1890. Other notable lifeboatmen include Henry Freeman of Whitby, coxswain for 22 years, Robert William Hook (1828–1911), coxswain at Lowestoft from 1853 to 1883 and credited with saving over 600 lives plus two dogs and a cat, Henry "Shrimp" Davies, coxswain of the Cromer Lifeboat with 45 years service and James Haylett, coxswain of Caister-on-Sea. One lifeboat has received an award: for the Daunt lightship rescue in 1936, the RNLB Mary Stanford and her entire crew were decorated (see illustration in history section, above).

Heritage
The RNLI maintains or encourages a number of entities in respect of the history and activity of the Institution along with preserved lifeboats, including:
Historic Lifeboat Collection in Chatham Historic Dockyard with 17 historic vessels.
The Grace Darling Museum opened in 1938 at Bamburgh, commemorating her rescue of the SS Forfarshire. The museum is run by the RNLI.
The Henry Blogg Museum illustrates the history of Cromer's lifeboats, and tells the story of Henry Blogg's most famous rescues.
The Lifeboat Enthusiasts' Society (a branch of the RNLI)
The (independent) Historic Lifeboat Owners Association, promoting the study and preservation of lifeboats.
The RNLI Heritage Trust's collection of historic items at its HQ in Poole, including fine art, model lifeboats, and an archive of historic documents and photographs.
The National Memorial Arboretum has a memorial dedicated to those who have served in the RNLI.
In 2017 Mikron Theatre Company toured a commissioned play In At The Deep End about the RNLI.

Operations
Throughout the United Kingdom and the Republic of Ireland, ships in distress, or the public reporting an accident, contact the emergency services by telephone or radio. Calls are redirected to HM Coastguard or the Irish Coast Guard as appropriate, who will coordinate air-sea rescue operations and may call on the RNLI (or independent lifeboats), or their own land-based rescue personnel and rescue helicopters to help.

Lifeboat stations

 there are 238 RNLI lifeboat stations around the coasts of Great Britain, Ireland, the Isle of Man and the Channel Islands. Tower Lifeboat Station on the River Thames in London is the RNLI's busiest, in 2013 rescuing 372 people and saving 25 lives. In 2015 Tower's launches had increased to 465.

For public access the RNLI classifies stations as one of three types: Explore, which are normally open all year round and have a shop, Discover, normally open during the summer months and Observe which, because of their location, still welcome visitors but may not be easily accessible.

From time to time the RNLI may close a station; some of these are later reopened by independent services. The history of some former lifeboat stations can be found in Wikipedia articles on the places where those stations were. (See also: List of lifeboat disasters in Britain and Ireland for further information on closed stations.)

Rescue craft

, the RNLI operates 444 lifeboats: 332 on station, 112 in the relief fleet. The ship prefix for all RNLI lifeboats from the D-class (IB1) to the Tamar-class is RNLB (Royal National Lifeboat).

All-weather lifeboats (ALBs) are large boats with enclosed wheelhouses and survivor spaces below deck, which are self-righting and can go out in all weather conditions. Some ALBs carry an inflatable Y-class lifeboat or Y-boat for inshore work, launched by mechanical arm. There are six classes of ALB motor life boats, with speeds ranging from 17 to 25 knots. The RNLI's aim is to provide a 25-knot lifeboat to every all-weather crew, and has begun construction of an All-weather Lifeboat Centre (ALC) in Poole which, when complete, will save £3million per year. The RNLI took over the ALC in 2015 with the expectation of becoming fully operational in 2019, when six Shannon-class lifeboats a year will be built.
Inshore lifeboats (ILBs) are smaller boats that operate closer to the shore and in shallower waters than ALBs. There are two classes, inflatables and RIBs capable of 25–40 knots. The RNLI's Inshore Lifeboat Centre at Cowes, Isle of Wight, has been building lifeboats since the 1960s and by 2015 had produced over 1,600.
Hovercraft were introduced in 2002, allowing rescue on mudflats and in river estuaries inaccessible to conventional boats.

Personnel and equipment
Lifeboat crews are composed almost entirely of volunteers, numbering 4,600 in 2013, including over 300 women. They are supported by 3,000 volunteer shore crew and station management. Lifejackets have evolved from cork, kapok and synthetic foam to today's light and non-cumbersome designs. ALB and ILB crews wear different styles of lifejacket. ALB crews wear lifejackets that inflate automatically when submerged in water, while ILB crews wear lifejackets that are already inflated.

RNLI lifeguards are placed on more than 200 beaches around England, Wales, Northern Ireland and the Channel Islands, and aided almost 20,000 people in 2014. The lifeguards are paid by the appropriate town or city council, while the RNLI provides their equipment and training.

The institution has operated an International Flood Rescue Team since the 2000 Mozambique floods, with six strategically placed teams each with two boats, support transport and equipment. The teams are formed of volunteer lifeboat crew with a range of additional skills, prepared to travel to emergencies overseas at short notice. They have trained alongside other teams for the common purpose in the United States.

Women in the RNLI
In the early days of the service, lifeboat launch and recovery was usually undertaken by women. There were deeply-held views about women crewing the boats – it was considered extremely bad luck. Along all parts of the coastline, women supported their men on the lifeboat crews by working together to get the lifeboat afloat and then later recovering it from the water in readiness for when the next call came. While lifeboat crew are still predominantly male (92%), the first female (inshore) crew member was Elizabeth Hostvedt in 1969, and Frances Glody was the first woman crew member on an all-weather lifeboat, at Dunmore East Lifeboat Station, in 1981. Lauren McGuire, at the age of 27, became the RNLI's youngest station manager in 2011, at Clovelly, Devon. In 2017 at Harwich Lifeboat Station, Di Bush became the RNLI’s first female full-time mechanic. Four years later she was appointed coxswain of the Harwich Lifeboat, making her the first female full-time coxswain in the RNLI’s history. In 2011, Cardigan Lifeboat Station launched an all-female crew in what was believed to be a first in Wales. In 2022, Cullercoats RNLI station launched its first all-female lifeboat crew.

Voluntary support

Apart from lifeboat crew and lifeguards, the Institution provides a variety of volunteering opportunities. One of these is as "Deckhand" where signed-up volunteers are notified by email or mobile phone when there is a local need, such as marshalling at fundraising events, helping with collections or in an RNLI shop. Voluntary internships in RNLI offices are available three times a year.

Patronage
Since its establishment in 1924, the RNLI has enjoyed royal patronage. Her Majesty Queen Elizabeth was patron until her death on 8 September 2022.

Safety advice

In addition to safety advice given in its publications, the RNLI offers safety advice to boat and beach users when the opportunity arises, and to at-risk groups such as anglers, divers and kayakers. The Institution runs sea and beach safety sessions for young people, particularly in inner-city areas; in 2013, more than 6,000 children a week were spoken to by education volunteers about sea and beach safety, and over 800 children a week received training. 500 children were taught to swim in 2014. In an effort to reduce the estimated 400,000 drownings a year worldwide, more than half of them children, the RNLI extends practical or strategic safety advice to lifesaver organisations overseas, in some cases providing training at the Lifeboat College.

Attitude to salvage 
The RNLI does not support or encourage salvage (the recovery of a ship and its cargo). This is for two reasons: firstly, because they exist to save lives at sea, and secondly, to become involved in salvage might discourage those whose lives are at risk from calling for help. The RNLI's Sea Safety Guidelines state that "There is no 'salvage' fee when you are towed by a lifeboat, but a voluntary contribution to the RNLI is always very welcome!". This stance was reinforced in Newquay in 2009, when the RNLI was criticised for not launching a lifeboat in order to aid an unmanned fishing vessel that had run aground. A spokesman for the RNLI declared that "We are not a salvage firm and our charity's aim is to provide immediate assistance for people in trouble at sea and lives are at risk."

There have been a few isolated cases where RNLI crew members (but not the RNLI itself) have claimed salvage. There is no legal reason why crew members of the RNLI could not salvage a vessel, since they frequently tow small vessels to safety, often over long distances.

Infrastructure

The RNLI's chief executive is Mark Dowie, formerly lifeboat operations manager at Salcombe RNLI; he succeeded Vice Admiral Paul Boissier, RN, on 15 May 2019.

The Institution used to be split into six administrative divisions: East (East Anglia and South East England), South (South West England), West (Wales and the Isle of Man), North (East and west coasts of northern England), Scotland and Ireland (Republic of Ireland and Northern Ireland). Since 2017 (2020 for non-operational departments) the Divisions became Regions: North & East (Berwick upon Tweed to Burnham on Crouch), South East (Southend to Swanage including River Thames), South West (Weymouth to Portishead including Channel Islands), Wales & West England (including Isle of Man), Scotland and Ireland.

The RNLI's main base is in Poole, Dorset, adjacent to Holes Bay in Poole Harbour. It includes RNLI HQ, lifeboat maintenance and repair facilities, the Lifeboat Support Centre and RNLI College (the training centre). The support centre and college were opened by Queen Elizabeth II in 2004. Specialist training facilities include a wave and capsize pool, a fire simulator, a ship's bridge simulator and an engineering workshop. The College's accommodation is available for RNLI members and their guests when training is not taking place and offers facilities for weddings, conferences and other events. About half of the RNLI's staff work at Poole. Other locations are Dublin, London, Perth, Saltash, St Asaph and Stockton-on-Tees, while some roles are at lifeboat stations or home-based and include operations, estate and financial management, public relations and information technology. A new headquarters for RNLI Ireland was opened at Airside in Swords, County Dublin, in June 2006 by President Mary McAleese, attended by the then Chairman of the Executive Committee of the RNLI, Admiral Sir Jock Slater, RN.

Funding
The RNLI is principally funded by legacies (65%) and voluntary donations (28%), with the remainder from merchandising and investment. In 2021, the RNLI's income was £197.2million, which included government contracts worth £3.4million, while its expenditure on delivering a lifeboat service was £165.5 million. The Institution encourages corporate partnerships, which included in 2014 Waitrose, Yamaha and Fred. Olsen Cruise Lines.

There are 1,100 RNLI fundraising branches throughout the regions served by the Institution, many far from the sea, which may support a particular station, or a project such as a new lifeboat. The Institution estimated their volunteer network at 31,500 in 2014. The largest regular contributor is The Communications and Public Service Lifeboat Fund (known simply as 'The Lifeboat Fund') established in 1886 for civil servants to support the RNLI collectively; the Fund has provided the Institution with 52 lifeboats as well as other support.

The lifeboat collection boxes are seen nationwide, and have even become the target for thieves. A fixed, cast iron collection box in Porthgwarra, Cornwall, is Grade II listed. The Institution's annual fundraising day ("SOS Day") is at the end of January, but many lifeboat stations hold open days during the summer, hosting displays, stalls and other events, as well as in-station shops which are open full or part-time.

Nationally and internationally known celebrities in various fields are, or have been supporters and fundraisers for the RNLI; for example, the cartoonist Giles was a Life President of the RNLI and donated many cartoons which are still being used for RNLI charity cards and other illustrations, and Ross Brawn, the former Formula 1 team boss, in 2012 raised funds through a business challenge, for a new lifeboat for Chiswick Lifeboat Station on the River Thames in London. Other names include Bear Grylls, Ben Cohen, Daniel Craig, Bernard Hill, Celia Imrie, David Morrissey, James and Oliver Phelps, and Rebecca Newman, whose Coast to Coast tour in 2012 earned her an Outstanding Achievement Award.

Membership
Membership classes involve differing levels of contribution
Governor, which includes voting rights
Offshore, aimed at active sailors and boaters
Shoreline and Joint Shoreline, the most popular level
Storm Force, for younger members

Publications
From March 1852 to October 1854) the Royal National Institution for the Preservation of Life from Shipwreck published The life-boat, or, Journal of the National Shipwreck Institution. Volume 2, no. 1 started with a new name in 1855: The life-boat, or, Journal of the National Life-Boat Institution. The last issue under this name was volume 31, no. 341 in April  1940; Life-boat War Bulletins were published from No. 1 in September 1940; from 1945 to December 1946 simply entitled Life-boat Bulletin. From volume 32, no. 342 (June 1947), the journal has been called The Life-boat, more recently The Lifeboat and then Lifeboat.

Lifeboat is the quarterly magazine for all members, containing regional and national news from the Institution, featured rescues, book reviews and lifeboat launch listings, with a related news and features section in the RNLI's website. Archived copies are available in searchable form online.

Life-boat International is an annual publication, apparently a conference report, since 1974.

The website contains full details of the organisation and its activities, including fundraising, lifeboats and stations, history and projects.

See also
 Awards of the Royal National Lifeboat Institution
 Isle of Man Coastguard
 Independent lifeboats in Britain and Ireland

Similar organisations of other nations
 Royal Netherlands Sea Rescue Institution
 Société Nationale de Sauvetage en Mer – France
 German Sea Rescue Society
 Norwegian Society for Sea Rescue
 Swedish Sea Rescue Society
 Royal Canadian Marine Search and Rescue – West Coast of Canada
 National Sea Rescue Institute – South Africa

References

Further reading
Belby, Alec. Heroes All!: The Story of the RNLI. Patrick Stephens, 1992. 
Cameron, Ian. Riders of the Storm: The Story of the Royal National Lifeboat Institution. Orion, 2009. 
Farrington, Karen and Constable, Nick. Mayday! Mayday! The History of Sea Rescue Around Britain's Coastal Waters. HarperCollins, 2011.

External links 

 
 Official RNLI website – Lifeboats and lifeboat stations
 
 
 

 
Organizations established in 1824
Emergency services in the Republic of Ireland
Emergency medical services in the Republic of Ireland
Emergency services in the United Kingdom
Emergency medical services in the United Kingdom
Poole
Sea rescue organisations of the United Kingdom
Sea rescue organizations
Charities based in Dorset
Water transport in Ireland
1824 establishments in the United Kingdom
All-Ireland organisations